Calcium-binding mitochondrial carrier protein Aralar1 is a protein that in humans is encoded by the SLC25A12 gene. Aralar is an integral membrane protein located in the inner mitochondrial membrane. Its primary function as an antiporter is the transport of cytoplasmic glutamate with mitochondrial aspartate across the inner mitochondrial membrane, dependent on the binding of one calcium ion. Mutations in this gene cause early infantile epileptic encephalopathy 39 (EIEE39), symptomized by global hypomyelination of the central nervous system, refractory seizures, and neurodevelopmental impairment. This gene has connections to autism.

Structure 
The SLC25A12 gene is located on the q arm of chromosome 2 in position 31.1 and spans 110,902 base pairs. The gene produces a 74.8 kDa protein composed of 678 amino acids. The encoded protein, Aralar1, is a multi-pass membrane protein located in the inner mitochondrial membrane. The N-terminal half of this protein contains 2 imperfect EF-hand domains along with 3 canonical EF-hand calcium-binding domains; this part of the protein binds calcium in vitro. Aralar's C-terminal half shares 28-29% identity with other members of the mitochondrial solute carrier family, including SLC25A11, SLC25A5, SLC25A1, and has 6 putative transmembrane domains like the other members of mitochondrial solute carrier family.

Function 
The protein encoded by SLC25A12, Aralar1, is a mitochondrial calcium-binding carrier that facilitates the calcium-dependent exchange of cytoplasmic glutamate with mitochondrial aspartate across the mitochondrial inner membrane. Aralar binds to one calcium ion with high affinity. Upon calcium binding, the EF-hand-containing regulatory N-terminal domain binds to the C-terminal domain, opening a vestibule which allows the substrates to be translocated through the carrier domain. In the absence of calcium, the linker loop domain may close the vestibule, which may prevent substrates from entering the carrier domain. As a member of the malate-aspartate NADH shuttle, Aralar is also involved in the transfer of cytosolic reducing equivalents from the cytosol to the mitochondrial matrix. Aralar, along with the protein encoded by SLC25A13, are both calcium-binding aspartate/glutamate carriers which are substrates in the TIMM8A/TIMM13 complex.

Clinical Significance 
Overexpression of Aralar1 augments mitochondrial metabolism and increases insulin secretion in pancreatic cells. Aralar is expressed as both a 3.2 kb and 2.9 kb mRNA transcript in heart and skeletal muscle cells, and in lesser amounts in brain and kidney cells.

Epileptic Encephalopathy 
Mutations in the SLC25A12 gene cause early infantile epileptic encephalopathy 39(EIEE39), characterized by refractory seizures, neurodevelopmental impairment, and poor prognosis. Development is normal prior to seizure onset, after which cognitive and motor delays become apparent. EIEE39 is characterized by global hypomyelination of the central nervous system, with the gray matter appearing relatively unaffected. Inheritance is autosomal recessive.

Autism 
2 SNPs in introns 3 and 16 of the SLC25A12 gene may be associated with autism. In Brodmann's Area (BA) 46 of the prefrontal cortex, SLC25A12 is expressed more strongly in the neurons of autistic people. SLC25A12 overexpression may modify neuronal networks in certain subregions of the brain during the fetal development of autistic patients.

Interactions 
Aralar has interactions with SCO1, ATF2, COX14, COA3, in addition to 36 other proteins.

See also 
 Solute carrier family

References

Further reading 

 
 
 
 
 
 
 

Solute carrier family
EF-hand-containing proteins